The 1983 Philippine Basketball Association (PBA) Open Conference was the third and last conference of the 1983 PBA season. It started on August 28 and ended on December 1, 1983. The tournament is an Import-laden format, which requires two imports per each team.

Format
The following format will be observed for the duration of the conference:
 Double-round eliminations; 14 games per team; Teams are then seeded by basis on win–loss records.
 The two teams at the bottom of the standings after the elimination round will be eliminated. The top two teams will advance outright to the semifinals. 
 The next four teams will qualify in a single round robin quarterfinals; The top two teams will advance to the semifinals.
 Semifinals will be a double round robin affair with the four remaining teams. 
 The top two teams in the semifinals advance to the best-of-five finals. The last two teams dispute the third-place trophy in a best-of-five playoff.

Imports
Each team were allowed two imports. The first line in the table are the original reinforcements of the teams. Below the name are the replacement of the import above. Same with the third replacement that is also highlighted with a different color. GP is the number of games played.

Elimination round

Quarterfinal berth playoff

Quarterfinals

Semifinal berth playoff

Semifinals

All four teams were tied with three wins and three losses after the double-round semifinals. The PBA had their first-ever double playoff for the two finals berths.

Second seed playoff

First seed playoff

Third place playoffs

Finals

References

PBA Open Conference
Open Conference